The 2022 Asian Water Polo Championship was held from 7–14 November 2022 in Bang Sao Thong district, Samut Prakan province, Thailand. It was the Asian continental qualification for the 2023 World Aquatics Championships.

Men's tournament

Preliminary round

Group A

Group B

9th place match

Final round

Quarterfinals

Classification 5th–8th

Semifinals

7th place match

5th place match

Bronze medal match

Final

Women's tournament

Preliminary round

5th place match

Final round

Semifinals

Bronze medal match

Final

References

Asian Water Polo Championship
International water polo competitions hosted by Thailand
Asian Water Polo Championship
Asian Water Polo Championship
Asian Water Polo Championship